Jan Malinowski (April 24, 1931 – May 1, 2018) was an international speedway rider from Poland.

Speedway career 
Malinowski finished runner-up in the Polish Individual Speedway Championship in 1959. He was part of the Polish team that reached the final of the 1960 Speedway World Team Cup.

World final appearances

World Team Cup
 1960 -  Göteborg, Ullevi (with Konstanty Pociejkewicz / Mieczysław Połukard / Marian Kaiser) - 4th - 7pts (0)

References 

1931 births
2018 deaths
Polish speedway riders
Burials at Służew Old Cemetery